This is a list of diplomatic missions of Moldova. The landlocked country of Moldova, sandwiched between Romania and Ukraine, has a handful of embassies, mostly located in Europe.

America

Asia

Europe

Multilateral organisations
 Brussels (Representation to the European Communities)
 Geneva (General Delegation)
 New York City (Representation to the United Nations)
 Strasbourg (Representation to the Council of Europe)
 Vienna (OSCE)

Gallery

See also
 List of diplomatic missions in Moldova
 Foreign relations of Moldova
 Visa requirements for Moldovan citizens

References

 
Moldova
Diplomatic missions